"U Make Me Wanna" is a song by American rapper Jadakiss, released as the third and final single from his second studio album, Kiss of Death. The song features American singer and songwriter Mariah Carey and was produced by Scott Storch.

Critical reception
Billboard called the duet a highlight on the album. HipHopDX editor J-23 wrote: "it had disaster written all over it, but it is actually some really slick shit with a killer flute loop." Jon Caramanica of Rolling Stone wrote: "When he's (Jadakiss) undone, it's by tinkertoy production on tracks such as the insipid Mariah Carey vehicle 'U Make Me Wanna'. The Situations Samantha Watson wrote: "Fans of Mariah Carey will like the track 'U Make Me Wanna', the distinctive Mariah vocals with Jadakiss laying down lyrics, the track plays on an Egyptian like sound with added synthesised beats, not one of the best singles but it is one you can listen to." USA Todays Steve Jones called the song a "thug love anthem". Aqua Boogie of Vibe wrote that love themed "U Make Me Wanna" shows that Jada has more to offer than body counts and gun talk." Reviewing the album, RapReviews was favorable: "He even shows love for the ladies on the Mariah Carey-blessed 'U Make Me Wanna'. In 2020, Billboard ranked it as the 97th greatest song of Carey's career.

Charts

Weekly charts

Year-end charts

Release history

References

2004 songs
Jadakiss songs
Mariah Carey songs
Songs written by Jadakiss
Songs written by Mariah Carey
Song recordings produced by Scott Storch
Contemporary R&B ballads
Ruff Ryders Entertainment singles